The Alliant Destiny XLT is an American two-seat powered parachute, designed and produced by Alliant Aviation based at Richland, Michigan.

Design and development
The aircraft was designed to comply with the FAI Microlight rules. It features a parachute-style high-wing and two-seats in tandem in an open frame, tricycle landing gear and a single  Rotax 582 engine in pusher configuration. Versions were also available with a Rotax 503 or Hirth 3701 engine.

Variants
ST
Single-seat variant
LT
Two-seat lightweight variant
XLT
Heavier two-seat variant

Specifications (XLT with Rotax 582)

References

2000s United States ultralight aircraft
Single-engined pusher aircraft
Powered parachutes
Alliant aircraft